Arthur E. Jamieson (born c. 1901) was a rugby union player who represented Australia.

Jamieson, was born in Sydney and claimed one international rugby cap for Australia.

References

Australian rugby union players
Australia international rugby union players
1900 births
Year of death missing
Sportsmen from New South Wales
Rugby union players from Sydney